Dul Kor (also Romanized as Dūl Kor; also known as Delkorū, Dolkorū, Dūl Korū, and Eslāmābād) is a village in Avalan Rural District, Muchesh District, Kamyaran County, Kurdistan Province, Iran. At the 2006 census, its population was 202, in 63 families. The village is populated by Kurds.

References 

Towns and villages in Kamyaran County
Kurdish settlements in Kurdistan Province